Evan Olmstead (born 21 February 1991 in North Vancouver, British Columbia) is a rugby union lock and loose forward who currently plays for Biarritz Olympique in Pro D2 having formerly played with  Newcastle Falcons and a victorious Mitre 10 season with Auckland

References

External links

Living people
Canadian rugby union players
1991 births
Canada international rugby union players
Greater Sydney Rams players
Auckland rugby union players
Sportspeople from North Vancouver
Canadian emigrants to Australia
Newcastle Falcons players
Rugby union locks